The Ambrosiano was a national (domestic) Italian express train which connected Rome with Milan. The name refers to the patron saint of Milan. For its first 13 years it was a Trans Europ Express (TEE) service (train nos. 78/79).

It was introduced on 26 May 1974, after enough Gran Conforto carriages were delivered. The Ambrosiano served the same route as the more famous Settebello, but was locomotive-hauled, rather than using the distinctive ETR 300-type self-propelled trainsets used by the Settebello.  Southbound the train departed Milan in the late afternoon and reached Roma around 11 p.m.  Northbound, it originally departed in mid-morning, reaching Milan around 4 p.m., but the timings were later moved about 2 hours later.

On 31 May 1987, the Ambrosiano was changed from a TEE to a two-class InterCity train (nos. IC 534/535). By 1994, the IC Ambrosiano had been discontinued.

See also
 List of named passenger trains of Italy

References

External links
  TEE Ambrosiano

Named passenger trains of Italy
Trans Europ Express
Railway services introduced in 1974
Railway services discontinued in 1987